Planet Her is the third studio album by American rapper and singer Doja Cat. It was released on June 25, 2021, by Kemosabe and RCA Records. The album, titled after a fictional planet created by Doja Cat, sees her experimenting with sounds that were new and unfamiliar to her before, in an attempt to depart from mainstream music trends. She likened the shift in her musical style to travelling outside the Earth and into outer space. 

The album features guest appearances from Young Thug, Ariana Grande, The Weeknd, JID, and SZA, with Eve and Gunna featuring on the deluxe edition. Doja Cat served as Planet Her's executive producer alongside frequent collaborator Yeti Beats. Both worked with producers Al Shux, Dr. Luke, Aaron Bow, Rogét Chahayed, Mayer Hawthorne, Kurtis McKenzie, and Y2K, among others. Incorporating a variety of genres, Planet Her is an amalgamation of pop, R&B, and hip hop styles. Lyrically, the album touches on femininity, solitude, romance, sexual relationships, and many other topics.

Five singles were released in support of Planet Her: "Kiss Me More", "You Right", "Need to Know", "Woman", and "Get Into It (Yuh)", all of which charted within the top 20 of the US Billboard Hot 100. It reached number one in New Zealand and spent four non-consecutive weeks at its peak of number two on the US Billboard 200 chart. Landing inside the top ten of thirteen countries, it finished 2021 as the world's tenth best-selling album that year. Planet Her was positively received by most music critics, who praised the sonic versatility and vocal deliveries. The album was nominated for Album of the Year and Best Pop Vocal Album at the 64th Annual Grammy Awards.

Background and recording
Doja Cat rose to prominence in August 2018 as a "meme star" and internet phenomenon with the novelty song "Mooo!". Doja Cat released her second studio album Hot Pink in November 2019, and spent most of 2020 promoting its singles. In August 2020, she told MTV that her then-untitled third studio album would incorporate multiple music genres and that each song had its own "personality". Later in September 2020, Doja Cat revealed that her third studio album was complete and "all ready" for release. She also told iHeartRadio in December that it has a number of features and collaborations, and that each song has a "different kind of vibe" to one another.Half of the album was written in Hawaii in February 2019, where Doja Cat was on vacation with her manager and co-writer Lydia Asrat, recovering from a recent breakup. Recording for the album mostly took place under the lockdown constraints of the COVID-19 pandemic, largely between Doja Cat and American record producer Y2K's home studio, and The Sound Factory and Westlake Recording Studios in Los Angeles, California with American recording engineer Rian Lewis. Lewis claims that Doja Cat produced all her own vocals from inside the booth "with impeccable precision and intention," and that "every harmony, every massive stack, every backing vocal in a character voice... those are all her ideas, 100%." Doja Cat previewed the album tracks "Payday", "Ain't Shit" and "Love to Dream" while on Instagram livestreams in April 2020, May 2020 and May 2021 respectively. She recorded the final vocals for the opening track, "Woman", a month before the album was released.

In April 2021, shortly after confirming its title, Doja Cat said that Planet Her is her first album that "feels fully her own" and that as opposed to trying "to be a certain kind of pop star, she's simply embodying one". She said that like her previous record Hot Pink (2019), each song would be distinctly different from one another, yet there would be more cohesion on Planet Her as opposed to Hot Pink. Before its release, Doja Cat expressed her excitement about releasing R&B music and "exploring different lanes", ultimately describing the album as "unbelievable".

Concept and title

Doja Cat has explained that Planet Her is "the center of the universe" where "all races of space exist and its where all species can kind of be in harmony there". She noted that by naming the album Planet Her, she was "just trying to be cute" and clarified that it is not a planet for women nor a "feminist thing". The music videos for the singles from the album all occur on different locations on the planet, and aim to explore the respective aspects of these locations and what they mean. In an interview with iHeartRadio, she described the album as the most visually captivating project she has ever done, and noted that, because the album focuses on relationships, "it's not a huge statement, not a political statement. It's just Planet Her, for girls".

Creative director Brett Alan Nelson revealed that he initially felt worried when Doja Cat told him that she wanted the record to "feel space age", however he explained further: "We're doing a style of futurism that feels fresh. We don't know what our actual future holds, so we are making what Doja Cat's future is."

Cover artwork
The album cover was shot by American commercial photographer David LaChapelle. It finds Doja Cat "floating in a sea of outer space". Her body is covered with sparkles. There were a number of different photographs taken amongst different sets, yet Doja Cat chose the final shot as it was her initial idea and felt set on it from the start. Although it appears as if she is flying in the image, Doja Cat claims that she is submerged in rock after having fell from space, but said that it is "left for your interpretation".

Reception 
Insider interpreted through the album's music and lyrics that "Planet Her" is a place where "midday skies are streaked with pink and orange" and where "following your sexual urges is uncomplicated and morally good, where the feminine is divine and it's summer year-round." Rolling Stone described the planet as an "exquisitely strange and spectacularly camp world" and noted that "there's a bit of cheeky, sci-fi B movie references in the presentation but the content [of the album] itself is pristine pop fun."

Composition

Planet Her is primarily a pop, hip hop, and R&B record. It incorporates musical elements from a wide range of genres, such as afrobeat, reggaeton, hyperpop, and pop-rap. The album opens with a string of "funky," "fun" and "upbeat" tracks and towards the second half, the tempo mostly slows down for the more "introspective" tracks and Doja Cat "drifts from her usual raunchy lyricism to try out lovesick lullabies and heartbreak ballads, allowing the music to slow and a newfound vulnerability to emerge."

The opening track, "Woman", is "an empowering, unabashed ode to womanhood and feminine diversity" which also explores the thoughts, emotions and woes of being a woman. It's a bright, sexy and high-energy afrobeat song. In the lyrics, Doja Cat also details how patriarchy often tries to create competition by putting women against each other. The next track "Naked" features a reggaeton rhythm and is led by a "sultry" and "high-energy" vocal performance. Both "Woman" and "Naked" are driven by steel drums and pulsing bass.

The third track, "Payday", celebrates Doja Cat's wealth and fame in a high register, as she sings "I just can't believe I got what I wanted all my life". "Get Into It (Yuh)" is a tribute to rapper Nicki Minaj, whom Doja Cat pays respect to by saying "Thank you Nicki, I love you!" towards the end of the song. "Need to Know" is a "grinding sex jam" sung over an "icy" trap and R&B instrumental. Throughout the song, Doja Cat's "dense triplet flow is layered over futuristic disco production. "I Don't Do Drugs" featuring American singer Ariana Grande was described as a "masterclass in the airy R&B vibe" found in most of Grande's work. Its "candy-coated" production is driven by "whimsical xylophone" and "exploding bass". "Love to Dream" is a wistful space-age pop and R&B ballad driven by a downcast, distorted guitar lead and Doja Cat's high "crystalline falsetto" vocals.

"You Right" featuring Canadian singer the Weeknd is a slow, seductive song inspired by classic 1990s R&B. It's been described as a "sexy, atmospheric slow-burn" driven by "slick and twinkling keyboards". Over the gentle trap beat and through pitched down vocals of "Been Like This", Doja Cat processes her shifting feelings for a partner after noticing how they've changed and become more toxic, making it one of the most reflective on the album. "Options" featuring American rapper JID is a "solid rap song" which features 808s. "Ain't Shit" was noted to feature Doja Cat's "rapped eye rolls", a "falsetto refrain", and a "fed up attitude of the opposite sex". The sparkly, midtempo production on "Imagine" combines a trap bassline with traditional East Asian music. The penultimate song, "Alone", recalls a 2000's blend of pop and R&B. The final track on the standard edition, "Kiss Me More" featuring American singer SZA, is a disco-influenced ode to kissing. It has been described as "breezy", "flirtatious" and "cheeky".

Release and promotion 
Doja Cat first introduced the term "Planet Her" in August 2020 during the opening sequence of her performance at the 2020 MTV Video Music Awards, where she impersonated a television commentator and stated "Performing live on Planet Her is Doja Cat. Enjoy!". In late December 2020, she began subliminally teasing the album on Twitter by repeatedly tweeting the phrase "Planet Her 2021" over the course of a few weeks. On January 5, 2021, Doja Cat followed eight musicians on the platform and subsequently tweeted "Following them for a reason. Guess why.", alluding to imminent collaborations with the followed artists.

The title of the album, Planet Her, was confirmed in an interview with American magazine V in March 2021. The existence of the track "Kiss Me More", featuring SZA, was confirmed in the same interview. In the following month, Doja Cat revealed that the song "You Right" with the Weeknd would serve as the second single from Planet Her in a cover story interview with Billboard. The existence of the track "Need to Know" was also revealed at the same time. After announcing the release of this song as a promotional single on June 9, Doja Cat then used social media to announce the album's release date and reveal the artwork and track listing on June 10. The album was made available for pre-order on June 11, the same day "Need to Know" was released.

Planet Her was issued worldwide on June 25, 2021 at midnight local time, by Kemosabe and RCA Records, Doja Cat's third to be released under this contract. The standard edition has only yet been released on digital download and streaming formats, with a limited release of only a few thousand CDs on Doja Cat's online store. A deluxe edition of the album was released two days later on June 27, to digital download and streaming formats. The deluxe edition was released on CD format internationally on December 10, 2021. An LP format of the deluxe edition was released on May 27, 2022.

Singles 
"Kiss Me More" with SZA, was released as the lead single off the album on April 9, 2021. The song was serviced to contemporary hit radio, rhythmic contemporary radio and adult contemporary radio formats in the United States, as well as on contemporary hit radio formats in Russia and Italy. It topped the charts in New Zealand, Malaysia and Singapore, and also reached the top 5 in over a dozen countries such as the United States (No. 3), Canada (No. 5), the United Kingdom (No. 3), Australia (No. 2) and Ireland (No. 2). The song also became Doja Cat's second-ever song to reach number one on both Billboard's US Rhythmic and Top 40 radio charts. It has been awarded certification status in half a dozen countries, including gold in the United Kingdom from the British Phonographic Industry (BPI), and platinum in Australia from the Australian Recording Industry Association (ARIA).

"You Right" with the Weeknd was released as the second official single in tandem with Planet Her and its Quentin Deronzier-directed music video on June 25, 2021. The song debuted at number 11 in the United States, Australia, and Ireland, and peaked within the top 10 in Canada (No. 10), New Zealand (No. 6), and the United Kingdom (No. 9).

"Need to Know" was initially released as the first promotional single from the record on June 11, 2021, after having been announced two days earlier. After gaining traction on TikTok, it impacted rhythmic contemporary radio as the album's third single on August 31, 2021. Its corresponding music video was directed by duo Miles & AJ and features cameo appearances from Canadian musician Grimes and American actress Ryan Destiny. With little to no airplay, the song debuted at number 29 on the Billboard Global 200 as well as within the top 40 of countries such as Australia, New Zealand, Ireland, the United Kingdom, and the United States. It eventually peaked at number eight in the United States, becoming Doja Cat's fourth top ten hit (second from the album), outperforming "You Right", which was intended to be the "more important single".

The track "Woman" had started gaining popularity on TikTok in August 2021 after a dance challenge was created by Tracy Joseph. This brought the track to re-enter at the US Billboard Hot 100 at 84, peaking at #7 in May 2022, the third top 10 from the album; a sleeper hit. and debut on the UK Singles Chart at 26. It earned even higher chart placements across Europe. It was eventually released as the fourth single, impacting Italian contemporary radio on October 1, 2021, and US rhythmic contemporary radio on January 11, 2022.

The song "Get Into It (Yuh)" followed a similar resurgence with choreography from TikTok user David Vu, which helped it re-enter the Hot 100 at number 75.
It was sent to Italian radio stations as the fifth single from the album on March 11, 2022, as well as US rhythmic contemporary radio on March 29, 2022, and US contemporary hit radio on April 5, 2022.

Other songs

While on Instagram livestream in August 2020, Doja Cat hinted at her plans of releasing the song "Ain't Shit" as a single under the title "N.A.S", but this release failed to materialize. She had previewed the song on another Instagram livestream in early April 2020, and it soon gained traction on the video-sharing platform TikTok. With its continued success on the platform following the album's release, it became the highest-charting non-single, debuting at 24 on the US Billboard Hot 100. As of August 19, 2021, the album tracks "Ain't Shit" and "Get Into It (Yuh)" had amassed 655.7 thousand and 176.4 thousand user-created videos on TikTok.

Live performances 

Doja Cat performed a solo version of "Kiss Me More" for the first time at Triller's inaugural Fight Club event in April 2021. At the 2021 Billboard Music Awards in May 2021, Doja Cat and SZA performed the song together. Doja Cat again performed a solo version of the song within a medley at the 2021 iHeartRadio Music Awards later that month. During a solo virtual concert as part of American Express's "Unstaged" campaign in June 2021, SZA performed her verse from the song as well as the introduction and chorus usually sung by Doja Cat. She performed it in the same manner during a solo virtual concert as part of Grey Goose's "In Dream" campaign on July 2, 2021.

To celebrate both the release of Planet Her and Independence Day, American live music company The Day Party hosted a Doja Cat concert at Coney Art Walls in New York City on July 4, 2021. It was here where she performed five songs from the record, notably debuting "Get Into It (Yuh)", "Ain't Shit", "Need to Know" and "Woman". On July 10, she continued to celebrate the album release at a private nightclub in Miami, where she notably slipped and fell while on stage and earned praise for playing it off and carrying on with the performance. Throughout July and August 2021, music video network company Vevo conducted a series of Doja Cat performances of songs from Planet Her, all filmed on a set with gold structures amongst a Californian desert; her performance of album track "Ain't Shit" was published on July 3, followed by a performance of "Love to Dream" on July 6, and then "Need to Know" on August 6. Doja Cat performed six Planet Her tracks during a set at the Made in America Festival in Philadelphia. While suspended in the air at the 2021 MTV Video Music Awards ceremony later that month, she performed "Been Like This" for the first time, followed by a solo version of "You Right" featuring her additional verse from the extended mix.

Critical reception

Planet Her received generally positive reviews from music critics. At Metacritic, which assigns a normalized score out of 100 to ratings from publications, the album received an average score of 76 based on 14 reviews, indicating "generally favorable reviews". Rolling Stone wrote that despite it being her third record, Planet Her "feels like a debut". Exclaim! wrote that it has "no skips" and that it "showcases many sides to Doja but remains cohesive". The New Yorker expressed that it brings her "genre fluidity into perfect synthesis, building upon the pop-rap legacy established by her predecessor Nicki Minaj," noting that "Doja relishes stimulation, from paydays to addictive intimacy." The New York Times described the record as "outlandish, eccentric, lustrous, mercenarily maximalist pop".

Brandon Yu of Mic wrote that Planet Her "crystallizes her effortless, playful energy into a delightfully shape-shifting work. [...] she manages to execute a varied set of identity-swapping performances in a way that feels like a natural mark of her studied, eclectic talents rather than an exercise in chasing trends." Safy-Hallan Farah of Pitchfork described Planet Her as "a kaleidoscope of pop versatility that benefits greatly from a market that currently values eclecticism. It feels both premeditated and casual, well-crafted yet trenchantly frivolous." Farah wrote that Doja Cat "entertains and enthralls with minimal effort, especially in her delivery" as she "skates" on the record's "impeccable" production. She noted that above all else, Doja Cat's "candy-sweet melodies are the star" of the record. Using "Ain't Shit" as an example, Nick Levine of NME wrote that Doja Cat's lyrics "possess a plain-speaking power," while stressing that "it's not so much what she says, but the way that she says it." Beats Per Minute described Planet Her as "the type of pop album there should be more of: both playful and psychedelic, rich in intelligent production, and filled with charismatic and chameleonic performances," noting that Doja Cat "understands the appeal of both the pop-star spectre and syrupy production; everything on Planet Her is contained and refined, but never polished to a fault. She inhabits different characters and moods, her voice never wavering or coming across as too thin for what she attempts."

Alexis Petridis of The Guardian described Planet Her as a "light, summery, really well-produced and impressively concise record" with "music that plays to Doja Cat's strengths. She can genuinely sing as well as rap – she doesn't sound out of her depth duetting with Grande," noting that she's a skilled lyricist on "flippant and funny" topics rather than essaying weighty topics. He wrote that the album has "music with enough room for a degree of experimentation" but, however, was perplexed by how "an artist so evidently concerned with not taxing her listeners' attention spans" could get away with the "tedi[ous]" string of "insubstantial ballads". Craig Jenkins of Vulture described Planet Her as Doja Cat's best album to date and described her as "our new ice-cool pop-queen supreme". Gabrielle Sanchez of The A.V. Club wrote that the record "lacks the originality Doja made her name on" as she "loses herself in the pop space" with "predictable, uninspired sounds". Cinquemani of Slant Magazine felt that, other than "Kiss Me More", the rest of the album "leans heavily" on contemporary sounds, making it "hard to differentiate it from any number of other recent R&B efforts".

Commercial performance
With over 1,510,000 album-equivalent units sold in the US in 2021, MRC Data ranked Planet Her the biggest R&B album of the year and sixth best-selling album overall. According to the International Federation of the Phonographic Industry (IFPI), it was the tenth best-selling album of the year on all platforms worldwide in 2021, despite having a limited physical release.

In the United States, Planet Her became Doja Cat's highest-charting album as it debuted at number two on the Billboard 200 after moving 109,000 album-equivalent units, It additionally topped the Billboard Top R&B Albums chart, and in the following week, propelled up to number one on the US Top R&B/Hip-Hop Albums chart and remained at number two on the Billboard 200 after moving 68,000 units. When the album spent a third consecutive week at number two, it became the first album to spend its first three weeks at number two on the chart since The Pinkprint (2014) by Nicki Minaj in 2015. Planet Her spent another five weeks within the top 5 of the Billboard 200 with over 55,000 units earned each week; it re-peaked at number two in its eight week on chart, moving 1,000 units less than Billie Eilish's Happier Than Ever (2021). In March 21, 2022, Planet Her became the first album by a female rapper in history to spend 33 weeks in Billboard 200’s Top 10.

Commenting on the album's stable run on the Billboard 200, Billboard writer Kyle Denis said "Planet Her and its singles have unequivocally solidified Doja Cat as one of the defining pop stars of [Generation Z] era", bolstered by the TikTok appeal of her music, her "A-list" collaborations, "exciting" television performances, and social media presence.

In Australia, Planet Her opened at number 3 where it remained at for another two weeks, while dethroning Call Me if You Get Lost on its second week on the Top 40 Hip-Hop/R&B Albums chart, where it stayed at number one for yet another week. It spent eight consecutive weeks in the top 3 of the New Zealand Albums Chart, reaching number one its eighth week charting. In the United Kingdom, Planet Her debuted at number three on the UK Albums Chart where it remained for another week before dropping to number five in its third week. It was certified Silver by the British Phonographic Industry (BPI) in early September 2021, denoting 60,000 sales in the country. On the Irish Albums Chart it debuted at number four and remained in this position for another two weeks, before peaking at number 3 in its fourth week.

Accolades

Industry awards
Doja Cat received eight nominations at the 64th Annual Grammy Awards, six coming from the album, including Album of the Year and Best Pop Vocal Album for Planet Her; Song of the Year, Record of the Year and Best Pop Duo/Group Performance for "Kiss Me More" featuring SZA; and Best Melodic Rap Performance for "Need to Know". "Kiss Me More" also won in the "Best Collaboration" categories at the 2021 American Music Awards, the 2021 MTV Video Music Awards, and the 2021 MTV Europe Music Awards. The album received a nomination for Album of the Year at the BET Awards 2022. Subsequently, "Woman" was nominated thrice at the 65th Annual Grammy Awards (as the song was a sleeper hit) for Record of the Year, Best Pop Solo Performance, and Best Music Video.

Year-end lists
Planet Her appeared on many year-end best-of lists of 2021 ranked by critics and publications.

Track listing

Notes
  indicates a co-producer
  indicates a miscellaneous producer
 On clean versions of the album, "Ain't Shit" is excluded from the tracklist.

Sampling credits
 "Naked" samples "Here In Iowa" (2015), written by Marcus Erik Joons and Daniel Gustav Peter Tjaeder, as performed by Korallreven.
 "Get Into It (Yuh)" interpolates "Massive Attack" (2010), written by Onika Maraj, Sean Garrett and Alexander Grant, as performed by Nicki Minaj and Sean Garrett.
 "Kiss Me More" interpolates "Physical" (1981), written by Steve Kipner and Terry Shaddick, as performed by Olivia Newton-John.

Credits and personnel

Performers

 Doja Catlead vocals
 The Weekndlead vocals (track 8, 15)
 Young Thugfeatured vocals (track 3)
 Ariana Grandefeatured vocals (track 6)
 JIDfeatured vocals (track 10)
 SZAfeatured vocals (track 14)
 Evefeatured vocals (track 17)
 Gunnafeatured vocals (track 19)
 Aynzli Jonesbackground vocals (track 1)
 Jidennabackground vocals (track 1)
 Victoria Monétbackground vocals (track 6)

Production
 Doja Catexecutive production, vocal production, vocal engineering
 Yeti Beatsexecutive production, production (tracks 1, 13, 14), miscellaneous production (tracks 9, 11)
 Linden Jayproduction (track 1), co-production (track 13)
 Al Shuxproduction (track 2)
 Kurtis McKenzieproduction (tracks 2, 7), miscellaneous production (track 11)
 Y2Kproduction (tracks 3, 4, 6, 10)
 Sullyproduction (tracks 4, 6)
 Dr. Lukeproduction (tracks 5, 8)
 Digiproduction (track 7)
 Khaled Rohaimproduction (track 7)
 Aaron Bowproduction (track 9)
 Tizhimselfproduction (tracks 9, 11, 12), miscellaneous production (track 14)
 Troy Nōkamiscellaneous production (track 13)
 Mayer Hawthorneproduction (track 10)
 Rogét Chahayedproduction (tracks 11, 14)
 Mike Hectorproduction (track 12)
 Carter Langmiscellaneous production (track 14)

Technical

 Mike Bozzimastering (tracks 1, 2, 5, 8, 9, 11, 13, 14)
 Dale Beckermastering (tracks 3, 4, 6, 7, 10, 12)
 Jesse Ray Ernstermixing (tracks 1, 2)
 Jeff Ellismixing (tracks 3, 4, 6, 7, 10, 12)
 Serban Gheneamixing (tracks 5, 8, 14)
 Clint Gibbsmixing (track 9)
 Neal H Poguemixing (tracks 11, 13)
 Katrina Maria Ernsterengineering (tracks 1, 2)
 Kayla Reaganengineering (tracks 3, 4, 6, 7, 10, 12)
 John Hanesengineering (tracks 5, 8, 14)
 Joe Viscianoengineering (track 14)
 Noah "MixGiant" Glassmanassistant engineering (tracks 1, 2)
 Connor Hedgeassistant engineering (tracks 3, 4, 6, 7, 10, 12)
 Fili Filizzolaassistant engineering (tracks 3, 4, 6, 7, 10, 12)
 Hector Vegaassistant engineering (tracks 3, 4, 6, 7, 10, 12)
 Rob Morenoassistant engineering (tracks 3, 6, 11)
 Davide Cinciassistant engineering (tracks 12–14)
 Rian Lewisrecording (tracks 1–4, 6, 8, 11–14)

Charts

Weekly charts

Year-end charts

Certifications

Release history

References

Footnotes

Citations

2021 albums
Doja Cat albums
Kemosabe Records albums
RCA Records albums
Albums recorded in a home studio
Albums produced by Al Shux
Albums produced by Rogét Chahayed
Albums produced by Dr. Luke
Albums produced by Kurtis McKenzie